Vladimír Heger (30 January 1932 – 1 March 2021) was a Czechoslovak basketball player and coach. He was most known for his achievement as head coach of the Czechoslovakian and Dutch national team.

Coaching career
In 1965, Heger took over as head coach of the Czechoslovakia national basketball team. He won silver at EuroBasket 1967 and bronze at EuroBasket 1969. In 1983, he started as head coach of the Netherlands national basketball team. Heger led the team to the fourth place at EuroBasket 1983, the best ranking of the Netherlands of all-time. From 1984, he coached several clubs from the Eredivisie including Den Bosch, Zaandam and Akrides.

References

1932 births
2021 deaths
Czech basketball players
Czech basketball coaches
People from Prague
Heroes Den Bosch coaches